Sheryl is a female given name. The similar name Sherill may be male or female.

Notable people named Sheryl, Sheryll or Sheryle include:

Business
Sheryl Handler (born 1955), American businesswoman (Thinking Machines, Ab Initio Software)
Sheryle Moon (fl. 1990s–2000s), chief executive of the Australian Information Industry Association
Sheryl Sandberg (born 1969), American businesswoman, chief operating officer of Facebook since 2008

Film and television
Sheryl Braxton, contestant on Big Brother 2 (U.S.)
Sheryl Cruz (born 1974), Filipina actress
Sheryl Gascoigne (born 1965), British television personality and author
Sheryl Leach (born 1952), American creator of children's show Barney and Friends
Sheryl Lee (born 1967), American actress
Sheryl Lee Ralph (born 1955), American actress and singer
Sheryl Munks (born 1965), Australian actress
Sheryl Wheeler (1960–2020), American stuntwoman
Sheryll Anne Alonzo Yutadco, contestant on Pinoy Big Brother (season 1)
Sheryl Zohn (fl. 2000s–2020s), American television writer and producer

Music
Sheryl Bailey, American jazz musician and educator
Sheryl Cooper, wife of the rock star Alice Cooper
Sheryl Crow, American singer, songwriter and musician

Politics
Sheryl Allen, American politician and educator
Sheryl Davis Kohl, Representative in the Maryland House of Delegates
Sheryll Murray (born 1956), British Member of Parliament
Sheryl Williams Stapleton, majority whip in the New Mexico House of Representatives

Sport
Sheryl Johnson, former American field hockey player
Sheryl Morgan, Jamaican sprinter
Sheryl Scanlan, New Zealand International netball player
Sheryl Swoopes, American professional basketball player

Writers
Sheryl Berk (fl. 2000s–2010s), American writer
Sheryl Gay Stolberg (born 1961), American journalist
Sheryl McFarlane, Canadian author
Sheryl St. Germain, American poet and professor
Sheryl WuDunn, Chinese-American journalist

Other professions 

 Sheryll Cashin, American law professor and writer
 Sheryl Underwood (born 1963), African-American comedian, actress and television host
 Sheryl van Nunen, Australian allergy researcher and immunologist

Fictional characters
Sheryl Nome, character from the anime series Macross Frontier
Sheryl Whalen, character from the television series Baywatch, played by Ingrid Walters
Sheryl Yoast, character from the movie Remember the Titans, played by Hayden Panettiere

See also
Cheryl
Sherrill (surname)

Feminine given names
English feminine given names
Filipino feminine given names